The Treuter Mountains, formerly known as the Truter Mountains and the Trenter Mountains, are a small mountain range on eastern Devon Island, Nunavut, Canada. The Treuter Mountains are part of the Devon Ice Cap which forms part of the Arctic Cordillera mountain range.

See also
List of mountain ranges of Canada

External links
Treuter Mountains, Canada

Mountain ranges of Qikiqtaaluk Region
Arctic Cordillera
Devon Island